Christian Schandl (born 29 March 1978) is an Austrian retired footballer who is last known to have played as a forward for Wiener Sport-Club.

Career

Schandl started his career with Austrian top flight side Austria Wien. After that, he was sent on loan to Prater SV in the Austrian lower leagues. In 1998, Schandl signed for Hearts in the Scottish top flight. Before the second half of 1998-99, he signed for Austrian third division club Untersiebenbrunn, helping them earn promotion to the Austrian second division where he made 18 league appearances and scored 5 goals. On 13 July 1999, Schandl debuted for Untersiebenbrunm during a 1-1 draw with First Vienna FC. On 13 July 1999, he scored his first goal for Untersiebenbrunm during a 1-1 draw with First Vienna FC. 

In 1999, Schandl signed for Gençlerbirliği in the Turkish top flight but left due to injury and homesickness. In 2003, he signed for Austrian third division team Parndorf after almost signing for Hannover 96 in the German second division.  Before the second half of 2005/06, he signed for Austrian fourth division outfit Schwadorf, helping them earn promotion to the Austrian third division. After that, Schandl signed for Wiener Sport-Club in the Austrian third division.

References

External links

 
 Christian Schandl at Austria Wien Archiv

Austrian footballers
Austrian expatriate sportspeople in Scotland
2. Liga (Austria) players
Wiener Sport-Club players
Heart of Midlothian F.C. players
SC Untersiebenbrunn players
Association football forwards
Süper Lig players
Expatriate footballers in Scotland
Austrian expatriate sportspeople in Turkey
Austrian expatriate footballers
Living people
1978 births
Footballers from Vienna
Austria youth international footballers
Gençlerbirliği S.K. footballers